There are over 2500 listed buildings in Liverpool, England. A listed building is one considered to be of special architectural, historical or cultural significance, which is protected from being demolished, extended or altered, unless special permission is granted by the relevant planning authorities. Of the listed buildings in Liverpool, 27 are classified as Grade I listed and are recognised as buildings of outstanding architectural or historic interest. The following list provides information on all the Grade I listed buildings in the city.

In Liverpool, several of the Grade I buildings are recognised for their architectural importance, including the Albert Dock, which was the first non-combustible warehouse system in the world; and Oriel Chambers, which was the world's first metal framed, glass curtain walled building. The Liver Building is also recognised as one of the first reinforced concrete buildings constructed in the United Kingdom.

The oldest Grade I listed building in Liverpool is the Tudor manor house, Speke Hall, whose exterior largely dates from the 15th and 16th centuries. A small portion of All Saints' Church dates from the 14th century, although the majority was added later. The newest building on the list is the neo-Gothic Liverpool Cathedral, which wasn't completed until 1980, some 76 years after it was started. Most of the buildings on the list date from the Georgian and Victorian eras, the period during which Liverpool grew rapidly from a relatively small provincial coastal town into one of the most important ports in the world.

Of the 29 buildings in the list, 12 are places of worship, including the city's Anglican Cathedral, six Anglican churches, three Unitarian churches or chapels, a restaurant, a Roman Catholic church and a Synagogue. Five of the remaining 15 buildings in the list are located at the Albert Dock and comprise the largest single collection of Grade I listed buildings anywhere in England.

Grade I listed buildings in Liverpool

See also
Architecture of Liverpool

References
Notes

Citations

Sources

External links
Liverpool City Council listed buildings information page

 
Listed buildings in Liverpool
Liverpool-related lists